Zientara is a surname. Notable people with the surname include:

Benedykt Zientara (1928–1983), Polish historian
Benny Zientara (1918–1985), American baseball player
Don Zientara, American record producer and musician
Edmund Zientara (1929–2010), Polish footballer and manager